Cowlitz Chimneys are a group of four rhyolite towers located in Mount Rainier National Park in Pierce County of Washington state. As part of the Cascade Range, the Cowlitz Chimneys are situated southwest of Tamanos Mountain and east of Banshee Peak, all of which are visible from the Sunrise Historic District. The Sarvant Glacier is set on the north aspect of these remnants of a volcanic plug. Cowlitz is the name of several geographical features in Mount Rainier National Park, as well as the state of Washington. The name appeared as early as the Lewis and Clark journals of 1805 when it was written as "Cowliskee" and has the Chinook Jargon meaning of "capturing the medicine spirit".

 Main (South) Cowlitz Chimney - 7,605 ft
 Central Cowlitz Chimney - 7,421 ft
 North Cowlitz Chimney - 7,015 ft
 Third Cowlitz Chimney - 6,640+ ft

Climate

The Cowlitz Chimneys are located in the marine west coast climate zone of western North America. Most weather fronts originate in the Pacific Ocean, and travel northeast toward the Cascade Mountains. As fronts approach, they are forced upward by the peaks of the Cascade Range (Orographic lift), causing them to drop their moisture in the form of rain or snowfall onto the Cascades. As a result, the west side of the Cascades experiences high precipitation, especially during the winter months in the form of snowfall. During winter months, weather is usually cloudy, but, due to high pressure systems over the Pacific Ocean that intensify during summer months, there is often little or no cloud cover during the summer. Because of maritime influence, snow tends to be wet and heavy, resulting in high avalanche danger. Precipitation runoff from Cowlitz Chimneys drains into the Cowlitz River.

See also

 Geography of Washington (state)
 Geology of the Pacific Northwest

References

External links

 
 National Park Service web site: Mount Rainier National Park
 Cowlitz Chimneys weather: Mountain Forecast

Cascade Range
Mountains of Pierce County, Washington
Mountains of Washington (state)
Mount Rainier National Park
North American 2000 m summits